Paul Mills is an Australian former rugby league footballer who played in the 1970s.

Playing career
Originally from the Waratah - Mayfield Club, in Newcastle, New South Wales, Mills was a speedy winger with the St George Dragons and played with them for five seasons between 1971–1975. Mills played wing in the 1975 Grand Final, although he left the club after that match.

References

Living people
Australian rugby league players
Rugby league players from Newcastle, New South Wales
Rugby league wingers
St. George Dragons players
Year of birth missing (living people)